Saros cycle series 138 for solar eclipses occurs at the Moon's descending node, repeating every 18 years, 11 days, containing 70 events. 16 of these are partial solar eclipses. All eclipses in this series occurs at the Moon's descending node.

This solar saros is linked to Lunar Saros 131.

Antipode of Lunar Saros 131 is Solar Saros 138

Saros 138 
It is a part of Saros cycle 138, repeating every 18 years, 11 days, containing 70 events. The series started with partial solar eclipse on June 6, 1472. It contains annular eclipses from August 31, 1598 through February 18, 2482 with a hybrid eclipse on March 1, 2500. It has total eclipses from March 12, 2518 through April 3, 2554. The series ends at member 70 as a partial eclipse on July 11, 2716. The longest duration of totality will be only 56 seconds on April 3, 2554.
<noinclude>

Umbral eclipses
Umbral eclipses (annular, total and hybrid) can be further classified as either: 1) Central (two limits), 2) Central (one limit) or 3) Non-Central (one limit). The statistical distribution of these classes in Saros series 138 appears in the following table.

Events

References 
 NASA - Catalog of Solar Eclipses of Saros 138

External links
Saros cycle 138 - Information and visualization

Solar saros series